Wladimir Besnard (1890, St. Petersburg, Russia – 1960, São Paulo, Brazil) was a French biologist  and Brazilian oceanographer, and is considered to be the father of Brazilian oceanography.

He was born in the Russian Empire of French parents.

As a biologist he is credited (together with Theodore Monod) with the discovery of the skeleton of the Asselar man in 1927  (although various sources refer to him as M.M. Besnard or M.V. Besnard).

An oceanographic ship, some undersea features (Besnard Bank, Besnard Passage), and a street in São Paulo (Rua Professor Wladimir Besnard) are named in his honor.

Oceanographic ship

During 1967-2008 Brazil operated Professor W. Besnard, its only oceanographic vessel at that time. The ship was launched on August 18, 1966 from the shipyard Mjellem & Karlsen, Norway, and belonged to the Institute of Oceanography of the University of São Paulo. In 1988 the ship suffered damage from a fire. In 2012 a new ship, Alpha Crucis, has replaced the Professor W. Besnard.

See also
 Alpha Crucis (research vessel)

References

1890 births
1960 deaths
20th-century French biologists
French oceanographers
Brazilian biologists
French expatriates in the Russian Empire
French emigrants to Brazil